Kippistia is a genus of flowering plants in the family Asteraceae. The name commemorates Richard Kippist, librarian to the Linnean Society.

There is only one known species, Kippistia suaedifolia, native to Australia. It is found in every state and territory in the country except Tasmania.

Taxonomy
Although Kippistia is currently considered a monotypic taxon, in 1872, John Miers used the same name to describe some South American plants in the Celastraceae. Miers was aware that Ferdinand von Mueller had already applied the name to some very different Australian plants. Therefore, Miers' names needed to be changed:
 Kippistia cognata Miers  - Cheiloclinium cognatum (Miers) A.C.Sm.
 Kippistia diffusiflora Miers  - Cheiloclinium diffusiflorum (Miers) A.C.Sm.
 Kippistia organensis Miers  - Cheiloclinium serratum (Cambess.) A.C.Sm.
 Kippistia serrata (Cambess.) Miers - Cheiloclinium serratum (Cambess.) A.C.Sm.

References

Monotypic Asteraceae genera
Endemic flora of Australia
Astereae
Taxa named by Ferdinand von Mueller